The 15th Legislative Assembly of Quebec is the provincial legislature in Quebec, Canada that existed from June 23, 1919, to February 5, 1923. The Quebec Liberal Party led by Lomer Gouin and Louis-Alexandre Taschereau was the governing party. Taschereau succeeded Gouin in 1920 as Premier of Quebec.

Seats per political party

 After the 1919 elections

Member list

This was the list of members of the Legislative Assembly of Quebec that were elected in the 1919 election:

Other elected MLAs

Other MLAs were elected during the mandate

 Édouard Hamel, Quebec Liberal Party, Portneuf, October 11, 1920 
 Nérée Morin, Quebec Liberal Party, Kamouraska, October 19, 1920 
 Léonide-Nestor-Arthur Ricard, Quebec Liberal Party, Saint-Maurice, October 19, 1920 
 Joseph-Hughes Fortier, Quebec Liberal Party, Beauce, December 15, 1921 
 Jacob Nicol, Quebec Liberal Party, Richmond, December 15, 1921 
 Louis-Philippe Mercier, Quebec Liberal Party, Trois-Rivières, December 15, 1921 
 Cyrinus Lemieux, Quebec Liberal Party, Wolfe, December 15, 1921 
 Joseph Gauthier, Parti ouvrier, Montreal-Ste-Marie, December 22, 1921 
 Eugène Godbout, Quebec Liberal Party, Témiscouata, December 22, 1921 
 Jean-Marie Richard, Quebec Liberal Party, Verchères, December 22, 1921 
 Désiré Lahaie, Quebec Liberal Party, Labelle, August 17, 1922 
 Ludger Forest, Quebec Liberal Party, Sherbrooke, September 7, 1922

New or renamed electoral districts

The electoral map was reformed in 1922 prior to the elections that were held in the following year. 

 Abitibi was formed from parts of Témiscamingue
 The Ottawa district was renamed Hull in 1919.
 Matapédia was formed from parts of Matane
 Montréal-Mercier was formed from parts of Montréal-Laurier and Montréal-Dorion.
 Montréal-Hochelaga was renamed Montréal-Saint-Henri.
 Montréal-Verdun was created from parts of Jacques-Cartier.
 Napierville and Laprairie merged to form Napierville-Laprairie.
 Papineau was formed from parts of Labelle.

Cabinet Ministers

Gouin Cabinet (1919-1920)

 Prime Minister and Executive Council President: Lomer Gouin
 Agriculture: Joseph-Édouard Caron
 Colonisation, Mines and Fishing:  Honoré Mercier (1919), Joseph-Édouard Perrault (1919–1920)
 Public Works and Labor: Louis-Alexandre Taschereau  (1919), Antonin Galipeault (1919–1920)
 Lands and Forests: Jules Allard (1919), Honoré Mercier Jr (1919–1920)
 Roads: Joseph-Adolphe Tessier (1914–1916)
 Municipal Affairs: Walter Georges Mitchell
 Attorney General:Lomer Gouin (1919), Louis-Alexandre Taschereau (1919–1920)
 Provincial secretary: Louis-Jérémie Décarie (1919), Athanase David (1919–1920)
 Treasurer: Walter Georges Mitchell

Taschereau Cabinet (1920-1923)

 Prime Minister and Executive Council President: Louis-Alexandre Taschereau
 Agriculture: Joseph-Édouard Caron
 Colonisation, Mines and Fishing: Joseph-Édouard Perrault
 Public Works and Labor: Antonin Galipeault
 Lands and Forests: Honoré Mercier Jr
 Roads: Joseph-Adolphe Tessier (1920–1921), Joseph-Léonide Perron (1921–1923)
 Municipal Affairs: Walter Georges Mitchell (1920–1921), Jacob Nichol (1921–1923)
 Attorney General: Louis-Alexandre Taschereau
 Provincial secretary: Athanase David
 Treasurer: Walter Georges Mitchell (1920–1921), Jacob Nichol (1921–1923)
 Members without portfolios: John Charles Kaine, Narcisse Pérodeau, Joseph-Léonide Perron (1920–1921), Napoléon Seguin, Émile Moreau (1921–1923), Aurèle Lacombe (1921–1923)

References
 1919 election results
 List of Historical Cabinet Ministers (Page 1)
 List of Historical Cabinet Ministers (Page 2)

15